Cindy  Evelyn  Magara Amooti  is a Ugandan film director and academic.   She serves as  a Lecturer of Film Studies and Literature (specializing in Children's Literature, Literary Stylistics and African Literature) at Makerere University.      She has directed and produced several movies since 2006, such as   Fate (2006), Fair Play (2010),  Windows of Hope (2011), A Book for Every Child (2012) and Breaking the Mesh (2013). She also lectured  Film Studies at  University of Sydney  and at the University of Technology Sydney in Australia.

Early life and education
She was born in Parajwoki Village, Bujumbura Division, Hoima City. She graduated  with a Bachelor of Arts in Film & Literature (2002-2005)  and a Master in Literature (2014) from Makerere University .    In 2021, she graduated with a PhD in African cinema from the University of Sydney.

Career
She picked interest in  filmmaking while she was  an undergraduate film and literature student at  Makerere University in 2005.  Her debut film Fate, was released in July 2006 three months after her graduation with BARS (Hons). Dubbed as Uganda's first independent female filmmaker. Fate dupped Uganda's first professional film was premiered at Hotel Africana, Kampala and was  the first Ugandan film to screen at Cineplex Cinema and to Africa Magic channel (that was dominated by Nigerian and other West African films). Magara produced her film through her company Nyati Motion Pictures that she registered in 2006. She has written and directed three feature films, produced five films in total.

She was recruited into university service in 2008 to be mentored into teaching literature and film. She acquired her MA Literature in 2014. While being horned in academics, she took a strategic break from active filmmaking. She facilitated film workshops at Uganda Film Festival, worked as a chief  as a chief juror  for Pearl International Film Festival 2014 to 2017,  and since 2019, she serves  as a member of the OSCARS’ Selection Committee for the Best International Film Uganda.

From 2017, she then pursued a doctorial of philosophy studies in African Cinema from the University of Sydney that she was awarded in April 2021. From 2020, Magara resumed teaching children's literature, African Cinema and general film studies at Makerere University. Her creative efforts were focused on Afro History and children's cinema. She started the production of Conquer or Die a series about the precolonial Ugandan political dynamics from  1840 to 1900 that led to the colonization of East African territory known as Uganda today.

Published work
While she was studying at University of Sydney her PhD Thesis was about Contemporary East African Cinema: Emergent Themes and Aesthetics.
Her other published work include;

Magara, E. Cindy, “Imaging the Self: The Representation of Women in Mariam Ndagire’s Films” in Narrative, Agency and Subjectivity: Writing and Contemporary Eastern African Peripheral Subjectivities, edited by Edgar Nabutanyi, Danson Kahyana and Dominica Dipio, Fountain Publishers, 2018, pp. 163–191.
Magara, E. Cindy, “Developing Uganda’s Film Industry Requires Concerted Effort” in Uganda Film Festival Catalogue Magazine. 2016, pp. 46–46.
Magara, E. Cindy, “Empowering Ugandans Through Film” in Uganda Film Festival Catalogue Magazine. 2014, pp. 10–11.
Magara, E. Cindy, “The Concept of Heroism Among the Banyoro” in Performing Wisdom: Proverbial Lore in Modern Ugandan Society. Eds. Dominica Dipio and Stuart Sillars, Matatu 42, 2013, pp. 21–36.

Filmography

References

External links
 
Cindy Magara
Contemporary East African Cinema: Emergent Themes and Aesthetics
Lack of structures, piracy, killing Uganda’s film industry
Cindy Magara Movies or Tv Shows (upto Feb 2023) - Watch Online
Uganda: No Country for Filmmakers
Nyati Motion Pictures

Living people
Ugandan film directors
Ugandan film producers
Ugandan women film directors
Ugandan women film producers
1982 births